The following is a list of Cambodia's islands, all situated in the Gulf of Thailand. All islands are, apart from the group of the outer islands, in relative proximity to the coast and can easily and quickly be reached. The north-westernmost islands near and around the Koh Kong river (Khmer: Prek Kaoh Pao) delta area are to a great extent engulfed in contiguous mangrove marshes and consequently hard to recognize.

Almost all islands have more than one name and there are islands sharing names (e.g. 2 x Koh Moul, 2 x Koh Domloung). Ancient Malay and French colonial names are still being used and/or have merged with Khmer names. Individual and unstandardized Romanization of Khmer writing has resulted in multiple spelling variants of the island's names. Sources, such as Geonames offer several variants. Tables below follow the geography from north-west to south-east.

Islands off Koh Kong Province/Botum Sakor National Park

Islands off Sihanoukville/Krong Preah Sihanouk/Chhak Kampong Saom

Islands off Ream National Park

Islands off Kep

The outer Islands

Maps

See also
 Sihanoukville (city)
 List of Cambodian inland islands
 List of islands
 Gulf of Thailand
 Geography of Cambodia

References

External links

Island Database/List of islands
 Cambodia's islands up for grabs - Phnom Penh Post
 The Interactive Map - Mapcarta

Sihanoukville (city)
Populated places in Sihanoukville province
Gulf of Thailand

Islands of the Gulf of Thailand
Cambodia
Islands